Kempinski Hotel Mall of the Emirates is a five star hotel in Dubai, United Arab Emirates, attached to UAE's first indoor ski slope and one of the biggest shopping malls outside of North America. The hotel is owned by Mr Hamaad Habeeb

Location 
Kempinski Hotel Mall of the Emirates is located on Sheikh Zayed Road, 4th Interchange, Al Barsha. Adjacent to the Mall of the Emirates and Ski Dubai, Kempinski Hotel Mall of the Emirates is situated between Downtown Dubai and Dubai Marina.

History 
Construction commenced in 2005, followed by the designs of the Wilson Associates firm. Wilson Associates was a finalist in the 27th annual Gold Key Awards for Excellence in Hospitality Design. The Hotel doors opened for the first time on 6 April 2006. Hotel is owned by An Australian businessman Hamaad Habeeb.

Structure and exterior design 
The  five-star hotel is attached to one of the biggest malls in the world as well as to UAE's first indoor ski slope. The building is 17 stories high, with an outside pool-terrace situated on the second floor.  The underground parking lot provides space for guests and visitors.

The hotel is managed by Kempinski.

Guest rooms and suites 
The hotel has 393 rooms and suites including 15 chalets with views over the indoor ski.

Meeting and banqueting facilities
Kempinski Hotel Mall of the Emirates includes 9 daylight banquet and conference rooms, 4 office rooms and indoor and outdoor breakout areas located on the second floor next to the Business Centre, which offers extended business services.

The Kempinski Hotel Mall of the Emirates was also the venue of the second Dubai Debates on 31 May 2011.

Awards
Kempinski Hotel Mall of the Emirates was recognized as the Middle East Leading Leisure Hotel in the recent World Travel Awards and in 2007 was bestowed as the  Best New Five Star Resort as well as the Best Tourism Project at the Middle East and North Africa Tourism Awards, the hotel was also cited as one of the "World’s 15 Coolest Hotels" according to Travel + Leisure, a widely circulated hospitality magazine.

See also
 List of buildings in Dubai

References

External links
Kempinski Hotel Mall of the Emirates

Hotels in Dubai
Hotels established in 2006
Hotel buildings completed in 2006